Declan Farmer (born November 5, 1997) is an American ice sled hockey player and Paralympic gold medalist. Competing at the 2014 Winter Paralympics, he won a gold medal in ice sledge hockey at the 2014, 2018 and 2022 Winter Paralympics.

Career
A bilateral amputee, he has played sled hockey since the age of nine after first trying it out in Clearwater, Florida. He attended Berkeley Preparatory School in Tampa and graduated from Princeton University in 2020. In addition to the United States men's national team, he has played on the Spacecoast Hurricanes, Tampa Bay Lightning, and Florida Bandits sledge hockey clubs. He made the American national team at the age of 14 in 2012. He is also the recipient of the best disabled male athlete at the 2014 ESPY awards.

In the 2013 IPC Ice Sledge Hockey World Championships, he finished first on the American team in scoring, with eight points. Farmer won his second Paralympic gold medal in 2018, while being the tournament's leading scorer. He has qualified for his third Paralympic Games in 2022.

References

External links
 
 

1997 births
Living people
American amputees
American sledge hockey players
Paralympic sledge hockey players of the United States
Paralympic gold medalists for the United States
Ice sledge hockey players at the 2010 Winter Paralympics
Ice sledge hockey players at the 2014 Winter Paralympics
Para ice hockey players at the 2018 Winter Paralympics
Para ice hockey players at the 2022 Winter Paralympics
Medalists at the 2014 Winter Paralympics
Medalists at the 2018 Winter Paralympics
Medalists at the 2022 Winter Paralympics
Farmer, Declan
Paralympic medalists in sledge hockey